Weathervane Seafood Restaurants is a seafood chain in New England. It was founded in Kittery, Maine, in 1969 by Raymond and Bea Gagner. It is based in Kittery, Maine. The chain has five locations, with one in Kittery, Maine and four in New Hampshire; Dover, Chichester, West Lebanon, and a seasonal location on Weirs Beach in Laconia.

See also
 List of seafood restaurants

References

Further reading
 Weathervane Seafood Restaurant | Dining Review | MaineToday.com
 Weathervane co-founder recalled | SeacoastOnline.com

External links
 

Restaurant chains in the United States
Restaurants in Maine
Restaurants established in 1969
Seafood restaurants in the United States
Kittery, Maine
1969 establishments in Maine
Restaurants in New Hampshire